Appearance energy (also known as appearance potential) is the minimum energy that must be supplied to a gas phase atom or molecule in order to produce an ion. In mass spectrometry, it is accounted as the voltage to correspond for electron ionization.  This is the minimum electron energy that produces an ion. In photoionization, it is the minimum photon energy of a photon.

See also
Ionization energy

References

Mass spectrometry